Scope of practice describes the procedures, actions, and processes that a healthcare practitioner is permitted to undertake in keeping with the terms of their professional license. The scope of practice is limited to that which the law allows for specific education and experience, and specific demonstrated competency.  Each jurisdiction has laws, licensing bodies, and regulations that describe requirements for education and training, and define scope of practice.

Overview 
In most jurisdictions, health care professions with scope of practice laws and regulations include any profession within health care that requires a license to practice such as physicians, physician assistants, nurses, dietitians, respiratory therapists, physical therapists, occupational therapists, pharmacist and dentists among many others.

Governing, licensing, and law enforcement bodies are often at the sub-national (e.g. state or province) level, but federal guidelines / regulations also often exist.  For example, in the United States, the National Highway Traffic Safety Administration in the Department of Transportation has a national scope of practice for emergency medical services.

Examples 
 Registered respiratory therapist – All states and provinces who recognize registered respiratory therapist licensure allow for RRTs to provide extracorporeal membrane oxygenation (ECMO) support. Despite this, some institutions do not permit RRTs to provide ECMO support.  For the registered respiratory therapists working at the institutions that allow RRTs to provide ECMO support, it is within their scope of practice.  The RRTs who are not permitted by their institution to provide this skill are unable to include the support in their scope of practice.
 Paramedic –  In some states and provinces a paramedic is allowed to perform percutaneous cricothyrotomy if all other airway management fails.  In the states and provinces that do not allow this intervention, it is not within the scope of practice of the paramedic to perform.

See also
Health care professional requisites

References

External links 
Emergency Medical Services Division, NHTSA, U.S. Department of Transportation.

Medical regulation
Nursing regulation